Matúš Vizváry (born March 15, 1989) is a Slovak professional ice hockey player who played with Kajaanin Hokki in the second-highest league Mestis on Finland  .

References

External links 
 Profile at HokejPortal.sk
 Profile at Elitrprospects.com
 Website on team Kajaanin Hokki

1989 births
Living people
HC Slovan Bratislava players
Slovak ice hockey defencemen
Ice hockey people from Bratislava
Slovak expatriate ice hockey players in Finland
Expatriate ice hockey players in Belarus
Expatriate ice hockey players in Poland
Slovak expatriate sportspeople in Poland
Slovak expatriate sportspeople in Belarus